Top of My Lungs is the eleventh studio album from contemporary Christian group Phillips, Craig and Dean. It was released through INO Records on September 16, 2006. The album features the radio hit singles, "Saved the Day", "Your Name", and "Top of My Lungs".

Track listing

Credits 
Phillips, Craig and Dean
 Randy Phillips – lead vocals (1, 2, 4, 5, 7, 10), backing vocals
 Shawn Craig – lead vocals (1, 3, 4, 5, 9, 10), backing vocals
 Dan Dean – lead vocals (1-10), backing vocals

Musicians
 Nathan Nockels – acoustic piano, keyboards, programming, acoustic guitars, electric guitars, backing vocals
 Jeremy Bose – programming (2, 3, 8, 9)
 Jason Hoard – electric guitars
 Gary Burnette – electric guitar overdubs
 Mark Hill – bass
 Dan Needham – drums
 Tom Howard – string arrangements and conductor
 The Nashville String Machine – strings (2-5)
 Laura Ball, Matthew Ball, Kimberly Burr, Chase Ezell, Don Garrett, Joy Kayser, Anne Kayser, Kara Langer, Gabriel Lopez, Nathan Nockels, Stephen Proctor, Sarah Schatz and Denise Tabscott – choir (4, 7)
 Devin Dean, Garland Phillips and Danielle Dean – all vocals (11)

Production 
 Producer – Nathan Nockels
 A&R – James Rueger
 Recorded by Joe Baldridge, assisted by Kenzi Butler and Steve Beers.
 Tracked at The Sound Kitchen (Franklin, TN).
 Additional engineering (Track 8) – Chris Clayton and David Parker at SoundTown Digital (Fort Worth, TX).
 Overdubs recorded by Nathan Nockels at Berwick Lane (Franklin, TN).
 Strings engineered by Todd Robbins at The Sound Kitchen, assisted by Steve Beers.
 Choir (Tracks 4 & 7) engineered by Joe Baldridge at Antenna Studios (Franklin, TN), assisted by Darrell Lehman.
 Mixed by Tom Laune at Bridgeway Studios (Nashville, TN).
 Mastered by Andrew Mendelson at Georgetown Masters (Nashville, TN).
 Production Coordination – Alicia Lewis
 Design by Jay Smith/Jukebox Designs
 Creative Director – Dana Salsedo
 Photography – Michael Gomez
 Wardrobe Styling – Joseph Cassell
 Hair and Make-up – Tina Davis

Chart positions

Awards 

In 2007, the album was nominated for a Dove Award for Praise & Worship Album of the Year at the 38th GMA Dove Awards.

References

2006 albums
Phillips, Craig and Dean albums